This was the first edition of the tournament.

Hans Hach Verdugo and Hunter Reese won the title after defeating Purav Raja and Divij Sharan 7–6(7–3), 3–6, [10–7] in the final.

Seeds

Draw

References

External links
 Main draw

Indy Challenger - Doubles